A megaproject is an extremely large-scale investment project. 
According to the Oxford Handbook of Megaproject Management, "Megaprojects are large-scale, complex ventures that typically cost $1 billion or more, take many years to develop and build, involve multiple public and private stakeholders, are transformational, and impact millions of people". However, $1 billion is not a constraint in defining megaprojects; in some contexts a relative approach is needed, such as in developing countries, where a much smaller project (such as one with a $100 million budget) could constitute a megaproject. Therefore, a more general definition is "Megaprojects are temporary endeavours (i.e. projects) characterized by: large investment commitment, vast complexity (especially in organizational terms), and long-lasting impact on the economy, the environment, and society".

Bent Flyvbjerg, a professor at the Saïd Business School of the University of Oxford says that globally, megaprojects make up 8 percent of total global GDP. Megaprojects refer not only to construction projects but also decommissioning projects, which are projects that can reach multi-billion budgets, and have a high level of innovation and complexity, and are affected by a number of techno-socio-economic and organizational challenges.

Planning bias 

Care in the project development process is required to reduce any possible optimism bias and strategic misrepresentation, as a curious paradox exists in which more and more megaprojects are being proposed despite their consistently poor performance against initial forecasts of budget, schedule, and benefits.

Downsides 
Megaprojects are often affected by corruption, leading to higher cost and lower benefit.

According to the European Cooperation in Science and Technology (COST), megaprojects are characterized both by "extreme complexity (both in technical and human terms) and by a long record of poor delivery". Megaprojects attract a lot of public attention because of substantial impacts on communities, environment, and budgets, and the high costs involved. Megaprojects can also be defined as "initiatives that are physical, very expensive, and public".

Examples

Megaprojects include special economic zones, public buildings, power plants, dams, airports, seaports, bridges, highways, tunnels, railways, wastewater projects,  oil and natural gas extraction projects, aerospace projects, weapons systems, information technology systems, large-scale sporting events and, more recently, mixed use waterfront redevelopments; however, the most common megaprojects are in the categories of hydroelectric facilities, nuclear power plants, and large public transportation projects. Megaprojects can also include large-scale high-cost initiatives in scientific research and infrastructure, such as the sequencing of the human genome, a significant global advance in genetics and biotechnology.

According to Bent Flyvbjerg, "As a general rule of thumb, 'megaprojects' are measured in billions of dollars, 'major projects' in hundreds of millions, and 'projects' in millions and tens of millions."

Rationale
The logic  on which many of the typical megaprojects are built is collective benefits; for example electricity for everybody (who can pay), road access (for those that have cars), etc. They may also serve as a means to open frontiers. Megaprojects have been criticised for their top-down planning processes and their ill effects on certain communities. Large scale projects often advantage one group of people while disadvantaging another, for instance, the Three Gorges Dam in China, the largest hydroelectric project in the world, required the displacement of 1.2 million farmers. In the 1970s, the highway revolts in some Western nations saw urban activists opposing government plans to demolish buildings for freeway route construction, on the basis that such demolitions would unfairly disadvantage the urban working class and benefit commuters. Anti-nuclear protests against proposed nuclear power plants in the United States and Germany prevented developments due to environmental and social concerns.

More recently, new types of megaprojects have been identified that no longer follow the old models of being singular and monolithic in their purposes, but have become quite flexible and diverse, such as waterfront redevelopment schemes that seem to offer something to everybody. However, just like the old megaprojects, the new ones also foreclose "upon a wide variety of social practices, reproducing rather than resolving urban inequality and disenfranchisement". Because of their plethora of land uses "these mega-projects inhibit the growth of oppositional and contestational practices". The collective benefits that are often the underlying logic of a mega-project, are here reduced to an individualized form of public benefit.

Flyvbjerg argues that policymakers are attracted to megaprojects for four reasons:

 Technological sublime: the rapture that engineers and technologists get from building large and innovative projects, pushing the boundaries for what technology can do.
 Political sublime: the rapture politicians get from building monuments to themselves and for their causes.
 Economic sublime: the delight business people and trade unions receive from the profits and jobs created by megaprojects.
 Aesthetic sublime: the pleasure designers and people who appreciate good design get from building, using, and looking at something very large that is also iconically beautiful.

Economics
Proponents of infrastructure-based development advocate for funding large-scale projects to create long-term economic benefits. Investing in megaprojects in order to stimulate the general economy has been a popular policy measure since the economic crisis of the 1930s. Recent examples are the 2008–2009 Chinese economic stimulus program, the 2008 European Union stimulus plan, and the American Recovery and Reinvestment Act of 2009.

Megaprojects often raise capital based on expected returns—though projects often go overbudget and over time, and market conditions like commodity prices can change. Concern at cost overruns is often expressed by critics of megaprojects during the planning phase. Bent Flyvbjerg has noted the existence of incentives to overstate income, underestimate costs, and exaggerate future social and economic benefits due to lack of accountability and risk-sharing mechanisms. If the megaproject is delivered in a country with relevant corruption the likelihood and magnitude of having overbudgets increases.

One of the most challenging aspects of megaprojects is obtaining sufficient funding. Alan Altshuler and David Luberoff have found that creative and politically adept political leadership is required to secure resources as well as generate public support, mollify critics, and manage conflict through many years of planning, authorization and implementation. Other challenges faced by those planning megaprojects include laws and regulations that empower community groups, contested information and methodologies, high levels of uncertainty, avoiding impacts on neighborhoods and the environment, and attempting to solve a wicked problem.

See also
 List of megaprojects
 List of transport megaprojects
 Macro-engineering
 Megastructure
 Reference class forecasting
 Optimism bias
 Megaprojects and Risk
 When Technology Fails

References

External links
  Mega-project.eu, a website run by European Cooperation in Science and Technology
 Borovoye-Biocity – megaproject of Bionic City for Kazakhstan – S. Rastorguev, M. Kudryashov, 2008
 Catalogue of Catastrophe – list of troubled large projects

Engineering projects
 
Risk management